Johnsonville Township is one of thirteen townships in Harnett County, North Carolina, United States. The township had a population of 6,927 according to the 2000 census. It is a part of the Dunn Micropolitan Area, which is also a part of the greater Raleigh–Durham–Cary Combined Statistical Area (CSA) as defined by the United States Census Bureau.

Geographically, Johnsonville Township occupies  in southwestern Harnett County. There are no incorporated municipalities located in Johnsonville Township, however, there are several unincorporated communities located here, including the communities of Johnsonville and Spout Springs.

Townships in Harnett County, North Carolina
Townships in North Carolina